The Dysna ( Dzisna;  Disna) is a river that flows through Lithuania and Belarus into the Daugava River near the town of Dzisna.

The river originates from Lake Parsvėtas, near Dūkštas, Ignalina district municipality. It flows through Lake Dysnai and Lake Dysnykštis. Near Kačergiškės it turns east and for 39 km flows on the Lithuanian-Belarusian border. The length in Lithuania is 17 km. One of the lakes in the basin area is the Lake Drūkšiai that supports Ignalina Nuclear Power Plant.

Its largest tributaries are Birvėta, Golbica, Janka, Berezovka, Mnuta.

References
 

Rivers of Lithuania
Rivers of Vitebsk Region
International rivers of Europe
Belarus–Lithuania border
Rivers of Belarus